The 2014 Travelers All-Star Curling Skins Game was held on January 11 and 12 at The Fenlands Banff Recreation Centre in Banff, Alberta. The total purse for the event was CAD$100,000.

Teams
The top ten teams in the Canadian Curling Association's rankings system in the previous year were nominated, and the top four fan voting selections for each position (skip, third, second, lead) will play in the competition. The players that will compete are listed as follows:

Roster
The teams are listed in draft order by skip. Skips selected their teammates in a snake order, and were not allowed to choose their own teammates unless necessary. The draft was conducted on January 10.

A donation was made to the Banff Community Foundation on behalf of E. J. Harnden, who was selected last among the players.

Results
Brad Gushue, who had last pick in the draft, was given the choice of picking his opponent in the semifinal, and Gushue chose to play Team Jeff Stoughton in the first semifinal.

All draw times are listed in Mountain Standard Time (UTC−7).

Semifinals

Team Gushue vs. Team Stoughton
Saturday, January 11, 11:00 am

Team Martin vs. Team Jacobs
Saturday, January 19, 7:30 pm

Final
Sunday, January 12, 11:00 am

Final winnings
The final prize winnings for each team are listed below:

Notes

References

External links

 
Travelers All Star Curling Skins Game, 2014
Banff, Alberta
Travelers All Star Curling Skins Game, 2014
TSN Skins Game
Travelers All Star Curling Skins Game, 2014
Travelers All Star Curling Skins Game, 2014